Lam Pou-chuen (Pinyin: Lín Bǎoquán; 10 October 1951 – 2 January 2015) was a Hong Kong voice actor who was best known for voicing the character Doraemon for the Hong Kong version of the anime for over thirty years in addition to being the Cantonese voice of Sammo Hung in many of his dubbed blockbusters.

Life
Lam was born in Portuguese Macau but moved to Hong Kong as a teenager. He first worked as an office boy for a bank, but after being impressed by the voice acting of Tarzan he applied to be a voice actor at Hong Kong's TVB in 1971. Lam voiced the title character for Doraemon since the very first episode was broadcast by TVB in 1981. He continued to be the voice of Doraemon throughout the decades, only being briefly replaced in 1992 when he went over to the rival station Asia Television for a short period. Lam's continuous involvement sets Hong Kong's Doraemon apart from the original Japanese production which went through a re-launch in 2005, resulting in a complete change of voice cast. Lam and other cast members at the time reprised their roles when TVB started to broadcast the new 2005 series. Like his Japanese counterpart, the actor's Doraemon voice is instantly recognisable in Hong Kong and from time to time appears on variety shows and TV commercials.

Other prominent roles in animation that Lam had voiced include Garfield, Amuro Ray in Mobile Suit Gundam, Genzo Wakabayashi in Captain Tsubasa, Hiei in Yu Yu Hakusho and Squirtle in Pokémon. Outside animation, he was also the voice of the corrupt Qing dynasty official Heshen in the 2001 Chinese television series The Eloquent Ji Xiaolan, which remained his favourite role. He was also the usual voice for Sammo Hung and George Clooney in Cantonese dubs of their films.

Lam died at the age of 63 on 2 January 2015 in Hong Kong. He was reported to have been found unconscious at home and later confirmed dead at Nethersole Hospital. He was known to be suffering from diabetes. His last work was the 3D feature film Stand by Me Doraemon, which had yet to be released in Hong Kong at the time of his death.

References

External links
 

1951 births
2015 deaths
20th-century Hong Kong male actors
20th-century Macau people
21st-century Hong Kong male actors
21st-century Macau people
Deaths from diabetes
Doraemon
Hong Kong male voice actors
Macau emigrants to Hong Kong
Macau-born Hong Kong artists